Michigan's 36th Senate district is one of 38 districts in the Michigan Senate. The 36th district was created with the adoption of the 1963 Michigan Constitution, as the previous 1908 state constitution only permitted 34 senatorial districts. It has been represented by Republican Michele Hoitenga since 2023, succeeding fellow Republican Jim Stamas.

Geography
District 36 encompasses the entirety of Alcona, Alpena, Arenac, Crawford, Iosco, Kalkaska, Missaukee, Montmorency, Ogemaw, Oscoda, Otsego, Presque Isle, Roscommon, and Wexford counties, as well as parts of Bay and Manistee counties.

2011 Apportionment Plan
District 36, as dictated by the 2011 Apportionment Plan, stretched from Midland to the northern end of the Lower Peninsula, where it covered all of Alcona, Alpena, Arenac, Gladwin, Iosco, Midland, Montmorency, Oscoda, Otsego, and Presque Isle Counties. Other communities in the district included Alpena, Gladwin, Standish, Tawas City, East Tawas, Harrisville, Mio, Lewiston, Gaylord, Rogers City, and Alpena Township.

The district overlapped with Michigan's 1st, 4th, and 5th congressional districts, and with the 97th, 98th, 99th, 105th, and 106th districts of the Michigan House of Representatives. Most of the district lied along Lake Huron and Saginaw Bay.

List of senators

Recent election results

2018

2014

Federal and statewide results in District 36

Historical district boundaries

References 

36
Alcona County, Michigan
Alpena County, Michigan
Arenac County, Michigan
Gladwin County, Michigan
Iosco County, Michigan
Midland County, Michigan
Montmorency County, Michigan
Oscoda County, Michigan
Otsego County, Michigan
Presque Isle County, Michigan